The 1907 Harvard Crimson football team represented Harvard University in the 1907 college football season. The Crimson finished with a 7–3 record under first-year head coach Joshua Crane.  Walter Camp selected only one Harvard player, halfback Jack Wendell, as a first-team player on his 1907 College Football All-America Team.  Caspar Whitney selected two Harvard players as first-team members of his All-America team: Wendell and center Patrick Grant.

Schedule

References

Harvard
Harvard Crimson football seasons
Harvard Crimson football
1900s in Boston